Sunward may refer to:

 Sunward Aurora, Chinese light-sport aircraft
 Sunward Cohousing, an intentional community located in Ann Arbor, Michigan, US
 Sunward Aerospace Group Limited, a manufacturer of model rockets and hobby store retailer
 , a cruise ship operated by Norwegian Cruise Line 1966–1976
 MS Sunward II, a cruise ship operated by Norwegian Cruise Line 1977–1991
 , a cruise ship operated by Norwegian Cruise Line 1991–1992 and 1992–1993
 Sunward UAV SUF-30 Flying Goose unmanned aerial vehicle
 A book describing the inner solar system for the Eclipse Phase role playing game

See also
Sundwarda, a moth genus in the family Erebidae